RC Aviator is a Ukrainian rugby club in Kyiv.

History
The club was founded in 1963.

External links
 RC Aviator on Ukrainian Rugby Portal

Rugby clubs established in 1963
Ukrainian rugby union teams
Sport in Kyiv